Float Like a Butterfly is an Irish drama film, directed by Carmel Winters and released in 2018. The film stars Hazel Doupe as Frances, a young Irish Traveller girl who idolizes Muhammad Ali and aspires to become a boxer.

The film premiered at the 2018 Toronto International Film Festival, where it won the FIPRESCI Discovery Prize.

References

External links

2018 films
Irish drama films
Works about Irish Travellers
2018 drama films
English-language Irish films
2010s English-language films